During the 1969–70 season Cagliari Calcio (then Unione Sportiva Cagliari) competed in Serie A, Coppa Italia and Fairs Cup.

Summary
In 1970, the boot was on the other foot as Gigi Riva led Unione Sportiva Cagliari with 21 goals in 30 games helped the Sardinian side win their only Serie A title. 

Having spent most of the 1950s mired in Serie B, Riva’s arrival in 1964 galvanised the team and was a magnet for other players to leave more fashionable clubs to head to Sardinia such as goalkeeper Enrico Albertosi (Fiorentina) and midfielder Angelo Domenghini (Inter).

After the team clinched the title, Italian national team manager Ferruccio Valcareggi called six players from this Cagliari squad — Albertosi, Domenghini, Gori, Riva, Comunardo Niccolai and Pierluigi Cera — to the 1970 FIFA World Cup in Mexico, where they reached a decent 2nd place.

Squad

Pre-season and friendlies

Competitions

Serie A

League table

Matches

Coppa Italia

First round

Quarterfinals

Final round

Fairs Cup

First round

Round of 32

References

Cagliari
Italian football championship-winning seasons
Cagliari Calcio seasons